The following sortable tables comprise the most topographically prominent mountain peaks of greater North America.  Each of these 353 summits has at least  of topographic prominence.

This article defines greater North America as the portion of the continental landmass of the Americas extending westward and northward from the Isthmus of Panama plus the islands surrounding that landmass.  This article defines the islands of North America to include the coastal islands of North America, the islands of the Caribbean Sea, the Lucayan Archipelago, the Bermuda Islands, the Islands of Greenland (Kalaallit Nunaat), the islands of Northern Canada, the islands of Alaska, and the islands of the northeastern Pacific Ocean.  The Hawaiian Islands are not included because they are considered part of Oceania.

Topographic elevation is the vertical distance above the reference geoid, a mathematical model of the Earth's sea level as an equipotential gravitational surface.  The topographic prominence of a summit is the elevation difference between that summit and the highest or key col to a higher summit.  The topographic isolation of a summit is the minimum great-circle distance to a point of equal elevation.

This article defines a significant summit as a summit with at least  of topographic prominence, and a major summit as a summit with at least  of topographic prominence.  An ultra-prominent summit is a summit with at least  of topographic prominence.

All elevations in the 48 states of the contiguous United States include an elevation adjustment from the National Geodetic Vertical Datum of 1929 (NGVD 29) to the North American Vertical Datum of 1988 (NAVD 88).  For further information, please see this United States National Geodetic Survey note.  If a summit elevation or prominence has a range of values, the arithmetic mean is cited.

Mount Logan exceeds  of prominence. Four peaks of greater North America exceed , ten exceed , 17 exceed , 34 exceed  and 100 exceed  of topographic prominence.

Of these 353 ultra-prominent summits of North America, 143 are located in Canada, 122 in the United States, 38 in Greenland, 26 in México, eight in Honduras, six in Guatemala, four in El Salvador, three in Costa Rica, three in the Dominican Republic, two in Haiti, two in Nicaragua, and one each in Jamaica, Cuba, and Panamá.  Six of these peaks lie on the Canada-United States border and one lies on the El Salvador-Honduras border.

Greenland

Canadian Arctic Archipelago

Brooks Range

Aleutian Islands

Aleutian Range

Alaska Range

Wrangell Mountains

Talkeetna Mountains

Kenai Mountains

Chugach Mountains

Saint Elias Mountains

Mackenzie Mountains and the Yukon Plateau

Alexander Archipelago and Vancouver Island

Coast Mountains

Interior Mountains and Interior Plateau

Columbia Mountains

Canadian Rockies

US Coast Ranges

Cascade Range and Sierra Nevada

Transverse Ranges and US Peninsular Ranges

Intermontane Plateaus

US Rocky Mountains

Appalachian Mountains

Mexico

Central America

Caribbean

Ultra-prominent summits

The following sortable table comprises the 353 ultra-prominent summits of greater North America. Each of these peaks has at least  of topographic prominence.

The summit of a mountain or hill may be measured in three principal ways:
The topographic elevation of a summit measures the height of the summit above a geodetic sea level.
The topographic prominence of a summit is a measure of how high the summit rises above its surroundings.
The topographic isolation (or radius of dominance) of a summit measures how far the summit lies from its nearest point of equal elevation.

Mount Logan exceeds  of prominence. Four peaks of greater North America exceed , ten exceed , 17 exceed , 34 exceed , 100 exceed , and the following 353 ultra-prominent summits exceed  of topographic prominence.

Of the 353 ultra-prominent summits of North America, 143 are located in Canada, 122 in the United States (excluding six in Hawaii), 38 in Greenland, 26 in México, eight in Honduras, six in Guatemala, four in El Salvador, three in Costa Rica, three in the Dominican Republic, two in Haiti, two in Nicaragua, and one each in Jamaica, Cuba, and Panamá.  Six of these peaks lie on the Canada-United States border and one lies on the El Salvador-Honduras border.  Additional references for the 200 most prominent of these summits can be found on the List of the most prominent summits of North America.

Gallery

Gallery

See also

List of mountain peaks of North America
List of the highest major summits of North America
List of the most isolated major summits of North America
List of mountain peaks of Greenland
List of mountain peaks of Canada
List of mountain peaks of the Rocky Mountains
List of mountain peaks of the United States
List of mountain peaks of Alaska
List of mountain peaks of California
List of mountain peaks of Colorado
List of mountain peaks of Hawaiʻi
List of mountain peaks of México
List of mountain peaks of Central America
List of mountain peaks of the Caribbean
North America
Geography of North America
:Category:Mountains of North America
commons:Category:Mountains of North America
Physical geography
Topography
Topographic elevation
Topographic prominence
Topographic isolation

Notes

References

External links

Natural Resources Canada (NRC)
Geographical Names of Canada @ NRC
Instituto Nacional de Estadística, Geografía e Informática (INEGI) de México
Sistemas Nacionales Estadístico y de Información Geográfica (SNEIG)
National Geodetic Survey (NGS)
NGS Datasheets
NGVD 29 to NAVD 88 online elevation converter @ NGS
Geodetic Glossary @ NGS
United States Geological Survey (USGS)
Geographic Names Information System @ USGS
Canadian Mountain Encyclopedia @ bivouac.com

World Mountain Encyclopedia @ peakware.com
peaklist.org
summitpost.org

Mountains of North America
Geography of North America
North America
Lists of mountains of North America